Cindy Cox (born 1961) is an American composer and performer, and Professor of Music. Cox grew up in Houston.
She holds a Bachelor of Music in piano performance from Texas Christian University, and her Masters  and Doctorate in 1992 from Indiana University Bloomington in composition, where she studied with Harvey Sollberger, Donald Erb, Eugene O’Brien, and John Eaton. She has also studied with John Harbison at the Tanglewood Music Center, and Bernard Rands and Jacob Druckman at the Aspen Music Festival. As a pianist, she studied with the Mozart and Schubert specialist Lili Kraus.  
As of 2011, Cox is a professor at the University of California at Berkeley.

Her orchestrations have been described as "music that demonstrates an extremely refined and imaginative sense of instrumental color and texture," "well-wrought," and "not easily classifiable."
and as having "prismatic colors" that suggest "a hybrid of Olivier Messiaen and Carl Ruggles — an odd couple indeed." Tim Page has described her Into the Wild as "a dark, fertile musical fantasy with some haunting and desolate chords."

Bay Area composer Cindy Cox’s work has been called “a delight to listen to” and “buoyant, puckish, rhythmically alive and crisply engaging” by San Francisco Chronicle critic Joshua Kosman. The University of California, Berkeley professor’s music is noted for its special tunings, harmonies, and textural colorations. She has received numerous awards, commissions, and the prestigious appointment of a Fellow at both the Tanglewood Music Center and Aspen Music Festivals. Her work has been performed throughout Europe, as well as Carnegie Hall, the National Gallery, the Kennedy Center, and by the Los Angeles Philharmonic.
She is married to the poet John Campion.

Awards
American Academy of Arts and Letters
Fromm Foundation
National Endowment for the Arts
American Composers Forum
ASCAP
Meet the Composer
Gemeinschaft der Kunstlerinnen und Kunstfreunde International Competition for Women Composers
Tanglewood Music Center (fellow)
Aspen Music Festival (fellow)
MacDowell Colony (fellow)
Civitella Ranieri and William Walton Foundations (fellow)

Discography
Columba Aspexit: Chamber Works of Cindy Cox, New World Records, NWCR886, pub 2007
Four Studies of Light and Dark, Society of Composers, Inc, "Extended Resources" Capstone Records, CPS-8626
Nature Is: Music of Cindy Cox, Albany Records, Troy955
The Other Side of the World "Points of Entry", Capstone Records CPS-8759

References

External links
Cindy Cox Biography
Cindy Cox at the Laurels Project
Jena N. Spurgeon interviews Cindy Cox
Cindy Cox home page

1961 births
Living people
20th-century American pianists
20th-century American women pianists
21st-century American pianists
21st-century American women pianists
21st-century classical pianists
American classical composers
American classical pianists
American women classical composers
American women classical pianists
American women in electronic music
Aspen Music Festival and School alumni
Classical musicians from California
Classical musicians from Texas
Composers for carillon
Jacobs School of Music alumni
Musicians from Houston
People from Fort Worth, Texas
Pupils of Harvey Sollberger
Texas Christian University alumni
University of California, Berkeley College of Letters and Science faculty